Andy Charleston Groom (born September 10, 1979) is a former American football punter who played in the National Football League for the Washington Redskins in 2005 and was a walk on for the Philadelphia Passion team of the now defunct Lingerie Football League.  At only 5’7” tall he was one of the shortest punters to play the game. He played college football at Ohio State University.

See also
List of people with surname Groom

1979 births
Living people
Players of American football from Columbus, Ohio
American football punters
Ohio State Buckeyes football players
Washington Redskins players